Normandy Mountain is a  peak in British Columbia, Canada, rising to a prominence of . 
It is part of the Canadian Rockies.

References
Citations

Sources

Two-thousanders of British Columbia
Canadian Rockies
Peace River Land District